Jan Svatopluk Presl (4 September 1791 – 6 April 1849) was a Czech natural scientist.

He was the brother of botanist Carl Borivoj Presl (1794–1852). The Czech Botanical Society commemorated the two brothers by naming its principal publication Preslia (founded in 1914). He is the author of Czech scientific terminology of various branches of science, including the Czech chemical nomenclature. He was the co-author of an important Czech taxonomic work, O Přirozenosti Rostlin.

Selected publications

See also
 Carl Borivoj Presl (C.Presl, 1794–1852) — Czech botanist, and younger brother of Jan Presl.
 :Category:Taxa named by Jan Svatopluk Presl

References

External links 
 —Quido.cz: "Biography of Jan Svatopluk Presl"

1791 births
1849 deaths
Scientists from Prague
People from the Kingdom of Bohemia
Old Czech Party politicians
Members of the Imperial Diet (Austria)
Czech chemists
Czech botanists
Terminologists
19th-century Austrian botanists
19th-century Austrian chemists
Charles University alumni
19th-century Czech people
19th-century lexicographers
Burials at Vyšehrad Cemetery